Pemmaraju may refer to:

As a given name
 Pemmaraju Sreenivasa Rao (b. 1942), Indian lawyer

As a surname
 Chandra Pemmaraju, Indian-American film writer and director
 Uma Pemmaraju (1958–2022), Indian-American journalist and television anchor